Abraham Belay is an Ethiopian politician serving as the Minister of Defense since 2021.  Abraham Belay is ethnically Tigrayan. He previously served as the Minister of Innovation and Technology, and as president of the Tigray Region Prosperity Party.

He serves as a board member of the Ethiopian Roads Authority and the Commercial Bank of Ethiopia. Previously, he also served as board chairman of the Ethiopian Communication Authority, Ethiopian Electric Power, the Metals and Engineering Corporation, the Ethiopian News Agency, and Ambo University.

References

21st-century Ethiopian politicians
Addis Ababa University alumni
Tigray War
Year of birth missing (living people)
Defence ministers of Ethiopia
Living people